János Pap (23 December 1925 – 22 February 1994) was a Hungarian communist politician, who served as Interior Minister between 1961–1963. Member of the Central Committee of the Hungarian Socialist Workers' Party (1959–1985). First secretary of the HSWP in Veszprém county (1956–1961, 1965–1985). Pap committed suicide.

References
 G. Tabajdi, K. Ungvári: Elhallgatott múlt, Corvina, Budapest, 2008, p. 102.

1925 births
1994 deaths
People from Kaposvár
Hungarian Communist Party politicians
Members of the Hungarian Working People's Party
Members of the Hungarian Socialist Workers' Party
Hungarian Interior Ministers
Members of the National Assembly of Hungary (1958–1963)
Members of the National Assembly of Hungary (1963–1967)
Members of the National Assembly of Hungary (1967–1971)
Members of the National Assembly of Hungary (1971–1975)
Members of the National Assembly of Hungary (1975–1980)
Members of the National Assembly of Hungary (1980–1985)
Hungarian politicians who committed suicide
Suicides by firearm in Hungary